The 1965–66 Washington State Cougars men's basketball team represented Washington State University for the 1965–66 NCAA college basketball season. Led by eighth-year head coach Marv Harshman, the Cougars were members of the Athletic Association of Western Universities (AAWU, Pac-8) and played their home games on campus at Bohler Gymnasium in Pullman, Washington.

The fifteen wins were the most for Washington State in fourteen years.

References

External links
Sports Reference – Washington State Cougars: 1965–66 basketball season

Washington State Cougars men's basketball seasons
Washington State Cougars
Washington State
Washington State